Edwin White (May 21, 1817 in South Hadley, Massachusetts – June 7, 1877 in Saratoga Springs, New York) was an American painter.

Life and career

Edwin White studied in Paris, Düsseldorf, Rome, and Florence and later taught at the National Academy of Design, in New York.  In addition to his studies under several different American and European painting masters, he also attended lectures at a Medical College in New York City to study anatomy. He also attended Amherst; where he received an A.M. by the end of 1856.

Works by White, mostly in storage, are in the collections of Yale; The Metropolitan Museum of Art; Museum of Fine Arts, Boston; New-York Historical Society.

A notable moment in White's career was noted in October, 1855, when he met the painter Sanford Robinson Gifford in Paris and told Gifford that he was about to return to New York, was destitute, had no commissions, and might have to return to portrait painting. However, when White did return to his New York studio, he went to work on his Mayflower painting, which he sold off the easel for $1,000, and a new and successful stage of his career was launched. His painting of Washington resigning was painted on commission by the state of Maryland, for $6,000, when White had returned to Paris.

The Mayflower painting was the basis for a 5-cent stamp issued in 1920 as part of the Pilgrim Tercentenary. An apparently later, unfinished painting of the same subject, from 1867, was left by the artist to Yale, and the university art museum has a collection of some 24 sketches White made preparatory to painting.

The artist was cousin to Andrew Dickson White, the first president of Cornell University.

Influential works
The Compact of the Mayflower  1855-56
 Washington Resigning his Commission 1858
 Pocahontas Informing John Smith of the Conspiracy of the Indians
Major Anderson Raising the Flag at Fort Sumter 1862.

Gallery

Minor works
Fisher boy, Florence Griswold Museum, Old Lyme, Connecticut. A sentimental genre subject of a boy and his dog.

References

1817 births
1877 deaths
19th-century American painters
American male painters
Amherst College alumni
National Academy of Design faculty
Orientalist painters
Painters from Massachusetts
People from South Hadley, Massachusetts
19th-century American male artists